Marcus Licinius Crassus (115 – 53 BC) was a Roman general and statesman who played a key role in the transformation of the Roman Republic into the Roman Empire. He is often called "the richest man in Rome."

Crassus began his public career as a military commander under Lucius Cornelius Sulla during his civil war. Following Sulla's assumption of the dictatorship, Crassus amassed an enormous fortune through real estate speculation. Crassus rose to political prominence following his victory over the slave revolt led by Spartacus, sharing the consulship with his rival Pompey the Great.

A political and financial patron of Julius Caesar, Crassus joined Caesar and Pompey in the unofficial political alliance known as the First Triumvirate. Together, the three men dominated the Roman political system, but the alliance did not last long, due to the ambitions, egos, and jealousies of the three men. While Caesar and Crassus were lifelong allies, Crassus and Pompey disliked each other and Pompey grew increasingly envious of Caesar's spectacular successes in the Gallic Wars. The alliance was restabilized at the Luca Conference in 56 BC, after which Crassus and Pompey again served jointly as consuls. Following his second consulship, Crassus was appointed as the governor of Roman Syria. Crassus used Syria as the launchpad for a military campaign against the Parthian Empire, Rome's long-time eastern enemy. Crassus' campaign was a disastrous failure, ending in his defeat and death at the Battle of Carrhae.

Crassus' death permanently unraveled the alliance between Caesar and Pompey, since his political influence and wealth had been a counterbalance to the two greater militarists. Within four years of Crassus' death, Caesar crossed the Rubicon and began a civil war against Pompey and the optimates.

Family and background
Marcus Licinius Crassus was a member of the gens Licinia, an old and highly respected plebeian family in Rome. He was the second of three sons born to the eminent senator and vir triumphalis Publius Licinius Crassus (consul 95 BC, censor 89 BC). This line was not descended from the wealthy Crassi Divites, although often assumed to be. The eldest brother, Publius (born c. 116 BC), died shortly before the Italic War, and Crassus' father and younger brother were either slain or took their own lives in Rome, in winter 87–86 BC, when being hunted down by the supporters of Gaius Marius, following their victory in the Bellum Octavianum. Crassus had the unusual distinction of marrying his wife Tertulla after she had been widowed by his brother.

There were three main branches of the house of the Licinii Crassi in the 2nd and 1st centuries BC, and many mistakes in identifications and lines have arisen owing to the uniformity of Roman nomenclature, erroneous modern suppositions, and the unevenness of information across the generations. In addition, the Dives cognomen of the Crassi Divites means rich or wealthy, and since Marcus Crassus, the subject here, was renowned for his enormous wealth, this has contributed to hasty assumptions that his family belonged to the Divites. But no ancient source accords him or his father the Dives cognomen; in fact, we are explicitly informed that his great wealth was acquired rather than inherited, and that he was raised in modest circumstances.

Crassus' grandfather of the same name, Marcus Licinius Crassus (praetor c. 126 BC), was facetiously given the Greek nickname Agelastus (the unlaughing or grim) by his contemporary Gaius Lucilius, the inventor of Roman satire, who asserted that he smiled once in his whole life. This grandfather was son of Publius Licinius Crassus. The latter's brother, Gaius Licinius Crassus (consul 168 BC), produced the third line of Licinii Crassi of the period, the most famous of whom was Lucius Licinius Crassus, the greatest Roman orator before Cicero and the latter's childhood hero and model. Marcus Crassus was also a talented orator and one of the most energetic and active advocates of his time.

Youth and the First Civil War
After the Marian purges and the subsequent sudden death of Gaius Marius, the surviving consul Lucius Cornelius Cinna (father-in-law of Julius Caesar) imposed proscriptions on those surviving Roman senators and equestrians who had supported Lucius Cornelius Sulla in his 88 BC march on Rome and overthrow of the traditional Roman political arrangements.

Cinna's proscription forced Crassus to flee to Hispania. He stayed in Spain from 87 to 84 BC. Here, he recruited 2,500 men (an understrength legion) from his father's clients settled in the area. Crassus used his army to extort money from the local cities to pay for his campaigns, even being accused of sacking Malaca. After Cinna's death in 84 BC, Crassus went to the Roman province of Africa and joined Metellus Pius, one of Sulla's closest allies, but did not stay there for long because of disagreements with Metellus. He sailed his army to Greece and joined Sulla, "with whom he stood in a position of special honor." During Sulla's civil war, Crassus and Pompey fought a battle in the plain of Spoletium (Spoleto), killed about 3,000 of the men of Papirius Carbo, the leader of the Marian forces, and besieged Carrinas, a Marian commander.

During the decisive battle outside the Colline Gate, Crassus commanded the right flank of Sulla's army. After almost a day of fighting, the battle was going poorly for Sulla; his own center was being pushed back and was on the verge of collapse when he got word from Crassus that he had comprehensively crushed the enemy before him. Crassus wanted to know whether Sulla needed assistance, or whether his men could retire. Sulla told him to advance on the enemy's center, and used the news of Crassus' success to stiffen the resolve of his own troops. By the following morning, the battle was over, and the Sullan army emerged victorious, making Sulla the master of Rome. Sulla's victory, and Crassus' contribution to it, put Crassus in a key position. Sulla was as loyal to his allies as he was cruel towards his enemies, and Crassus had been a very loyal ally.

Rise to power and wealth

Marcus Licinius Crassus' next concern was to rebuild the fortunes of his family, which had been confiscated during the Marian-Cinnan proscriptions. Sulla's proscriptions, in which the property of his victims was cheaply auctioned off, found one of the greatest acquirers of this type of property in Crassus: indeed, Sulla was especially supportive of this, because he wished to spread the blame as much as possible among those unscrupulous enough to do so. Sulla's proscriptions ensured that his survivors would recoup their lost fortunes from the fortunes of wealthy adherents to Gaius Marius or Lucius Cornelius Cinna. Proscriptions meant that their political enemies lost their fortunes and their lives; that their female relatives (notably, widows and widowed daughters) were forbidden to marry, remarry or remain married; and that, in some cases, their families' hopes of rebuilding their fortunes and political significance were destroyed. Crassus is said to have made part of his money from proscriptions, notably the proscription of one man whose name was not initially on the list of those proscribed but was added by Crassus, who coveted the man's fortune. 
Crassus' wealth is estimated by Pliny at approximately 200 million sesterces. Plutarch, in his Life of Crassus, says the wealth of Crassus increased from less than 300 talents at first, to 7,100 talents. This represented 229 tonnes of gold, or about 7.4 million troy ounces, worth about US$13.7 billion at November 2021 gold prices, accounted right before his Parthian expedition, most of which Plutarch declares Crassus got "by fire and war, making the public calamities his greatest source of revenue."

Some of Crassus' wealth was acquired conventionally, through slave trafficking, production from silver mines, and speculative real estate purchases. Crassus bought property that was confiscated in proscriptions and by notoriously purchasing burnt and collapsed buildings. Plutarch wrote that, observing how frequent such occurrences were, he bought slaves "who were architects and builders." When he had over 500 slaves, he bought houses that had burnt and the adjacent ones "because their owners would let go at a trifling price." He bought "the largest part of Rome" in this way, buying them on the cheap and rebuilding them with slave labor.

The first ever Roman fire brigade was created by Crassus. Fires were almost a daily occurrence in Rome, and Crassus took advantage of the fact that Rome had no fire department, by creating his own brigade—500 men strong—which rushed to burning buildings at the first cry of alarm. Upon arriving at the scene, however, the firefighters did nothing while Crassus offered to buy the burning building from the distressed property owner, at a miserable price. If the owner agreed to sell the property, his men would put out the fire; if the owner refused, then they would simply let the structure burn to the ground. After buying many properties this way, he rebuilt them, and often leased the properties to their original owners or new tenants.

Crassus befriended Licinia, a Vestal Virgin, whose valuable property he coveted. Plutarch says "And yet, when he was further on in years, he was accused of criminal intimacy with Licinia, one of the vestal virgins, and Licinia was formally prosecuted by a certain Plotius. Now, Licinia was the owner of a pleasant villa in the suburbs, which Crassus wished to get at a low price, and it was for this reason that he was forever hovering about the woman and paying his court to her, until he fell under the abominable suspicion. And, in a way, it was his avarice that absolved him from the charge of corrupting the vestal, and he was acquitted by the judges. But he did not let Licinia go until he had acquired her property."

After rebuilding his fortune, Crassus' next concern was his political career. As a wealthy man in Rome, an adherent of Sulla, and a man who hailed from a line of consuls and praetors, Crassus' political future was apparently assured. His problem was that, despite his military successes, he was eclipsed by his contemporary Pompey the Great. Crassus' rivalry with Pompey and his envy of Pompey's triumph would influence his subsequent career.

Crassus and Spartacus
Crassus was elected praetor in 73 BC and pursued the cursus honorum.

During the Third Servile War, or Spartacus' revolt (73-71 BC), Crassus offered to equip, train, and lead new troops at his own expense, after several legions had been defeated and their commanders killed in battle. Crassus was sent into battle against Spartacus by the Senate. At first, he had trouble both in anticipating Spartacus' moves and in inspiring his army to strengthen their morale. When a segment of his army fled from battle, abandoning their weapons, Crassus revived the ancient practice of decimation – i.e. executing one out of every ten men, with the victims selected by drawing lots. Plutarch reports that "many things horrible and dreadful to see" occurred during the infliction of punishment, which was witnessed by the rest of Crassus' army. Nevertheless, according to Appian, the troops' fighting spirit improved dramatically thereafter, since Crassus had demonstrated that "he was more dangerous to them than the enemy."

Afterwards, when Spartacus retreated to the Bruttium peninsula in the southwest of Italy, Crassus tried to pen up the slave armies by building a ditch and a rampart across the peninsula of Rhegium in Bruttium, "from sea to sea." Despite this remarkable feat, Spartacus and part of his army still managed to break out. On the night of a heavy snowstorm, they sneaked through Crassus' lines and made a bridge of dirt and tree branches over the ditch, thus escaping.

Some time later, when the Roman armies led by Pompey and Varro Lucullus were recalled to Italy in support of Crassus, Spartacus decided to fight rather than find himself and his followers trapped between three armies, two of them returning from overseas action. In this last battle, the battle of the Silarius river, Crassus gained a decisive victory, and captured six thousand slaves alive. During the fighting, Spartacus attempted to personally kill Crassus, slaughtering his way toward the general's position, but he succeeded only in killing two of the centurions guarding Crassus. Spartacus himself is believed to have been killed in the battle, although his body was never recovered. The six thousand  captured slaves were crucified along the Via Appia by Crassus' orders. At his command, their bodies were not taken down afterwards, but remained rotting along Rome's principal route to the south. This was intended as an abject lesson to anyone who might think of rebelling against Rome in the future, particularly of slave insurrections against their owners and masters, the Roman citizens.

Crassus effectively ended the Third Servile War in 71 BC. In Plutarch's account, Crassus "had written to the Senate that they must summon Lucullus from Thrace and Pompey from Spain, but he was sorry now that he had done so, and was eager to bring the war to an end before those generals came. He knew that the success would be ascribed to the one who came up with assistance, and not to himself." He decided to attack a splinter group of rebels, and after this, Spartacus withdrew to the mountains. Pompey had arrived from Hispania with his veterans and was sent to provide reinforcements. Crassus hurried to seek the final battle, which he won. Pompey arrived in time to deal with the disorganized and defeated fugitives, writing to the Senate that "indeed, Crassus had conquered the slaves, but that he himself had extirpated the war." "Crassus, for all his self-approval, did not venture to ask for the major triumph, and it was thought ignoble and mean in him to celebrate even the minor triumph on foot, called the ovation," nor did he wish to be honored for subduing slaves.

In Plutarch's account, Pompey was asked to stand for the consulship. Crassus wanted to become his colleague and asked Pompey for his assistance. As said in the Life of Crassus, "Pompey received his request gladly (for he was desirous of having Crassus, in some way or other, always in debt to him for some favor), eagerly promoted his candidature, and finally said in a speech to the assembly that he should be no less grateful to them for the colleague than for the office which he desired." However, in office, they did not remain friendly. They "differed on almost every measure, and by their contentiousness, rendered their consulship barren politically and without achievement." Crassus displayed his wealth by realizing public sacrifices to Hercules, entertaining the populace at 10,000 tables and distributing sufficient grain to last each family three months, an act that had the additional ends of performing a previously made religious vow of a tithe to the demigod Hercules and also to gain support among the members of the popular party.

In Appian's account, when Crassus ended the rebellion, there was a contention over honors between him and Pompey. Neither men dismissed their armies, with both being candidates for the consulship. Crassus had been praetor as the law of Sulla required. Pompey had been neither praetor nor quaestor, and was only 34 years old, but he had promised the plebeian tribunes to restore much of their power, that had been taken away by Sulla's constitutional reforms. Even when they were both chosen consuls, they did not dismiss their armies stationed near the city. Pompey said that he was awaiting the return of Metellus for his Spanish triumph; Crassus said that Pompey ought to dismiss his army first. In the end, Crassus yielded first, offering Pompey his hand.

First Triumvirate-Alliance with Pompey and Caesar

In 65 BC, Crassus was elected censor with another conservative, Quintus Lutatius Catulus Capitolinus, himself son of a consul. During that decade, Crassus was Julius Caesar's patron in all but name, financing Caesar's successful election to become pontifex maximus. Caesar had formerly been the priest of Jupiter, or flamen dialis, but had been deprived of office by Sulla. Crassus also supported Caesar's efforts to win command of military campaigns. Caesar's mediation between Crassus and Pompey led to the creation of the First Triumvirate in 60 BC, consisting of Crassus, Pompey, and Caesar (who became consul in 59 BC).  This coalition would last until Crassus' death.
In 54 BC, Crassus looted the Jewish Temple treasury.

In 55 BC, after the Triumvirate met at the Luca Conference in 56 BC, Crassus was again consul with Pompey, and a law was passed assigning the provinces of the two Hispanias and Syria to Pompey and Crassus, respectively, for five years.

Syrian governorship and death
Crassus received Syria as his province, which promised to be an inexhaustible source of wealth. It might have been, had he not also sought military glory and crossed the Euphrates in an attempt to conquer Parthia. Crassus attacked Parthia not only because of its great source of riches, but because of a desire to match the military victories of Pompey and Caesar. The king of Armenia, Artavazdes II, offered Crassus the aid of nearly 40,000 troops (10,000 cataphracts and 30,000 infantrymen) on the condition that Crassus invade through Armenia so that the king could not only maintain the upkeep of his own troops but also provide a safer route for his men and Crassus. Crassus refused, and chose the more direct route by crossing the Euphrates, as he had done in his successful campaign in the previous year. Crassus received directions from the Osroene chieftain Ariamnes, who had previously assisted Pompey in his eastern campaigns. Ariamnes was in the pay of the Parthians and urged Crassus to attack at once, falsely stating that the Parthians were weak and disorganized. He then led Crassus' army into desolate desert, far from any water. In 53 BC, at the battle of Carrhae (modern Harran, in Turkey), Crassus' legions were defeated by a numerically inferior Parthian force. Crassus' legions were primarily heavy infantry, but were not prepared for the type of swift, cavalry-and-arrow attack in which Parthian troops were particularly adept. The Parthian horse archers devastated the unprepared Romans with hit-and-run techniques and feigned retreats with the ability to shoot as well backwards as they could forwards. Crassus refused his quaestor Gaius Cassius Longinus' plans to reconstitute the Roman battle line, and remained in the testudo formation to protect his flanks until the Parthians eventually ran out of arrows. However, the Parthians had stationed camels carrying arrows to allow their archers to continually reload and relentlessly barrage the Romans until dusk. Despite taking severe casualties, the Romans successfully retreated to Carrhae, forced to leave many wounded behind to be later slaughtered by the Parthians.

Subsequently, Crassus' men, being near mutiny, demanded he parley with the Parthians, who had offered to meet with him. Crassus, despondent at the death of his son Publius in the battle, finally agreed to meet the Parthian general Surena; however, when Crassus mounted a horse to ride to the Parthian camp for a peace negotiation, his junior officer Octavius suspected a Parthian trap and grabbed Crassus' horse by the bridle, instigating a sudden fight with the Parthians that left the Roman party dead, including Crassus. A story later emerged to the effect that, after Crassus' death, the Parthians poured molten gold into his mouth in symbolic mockery of his thirst for wealth.

The account given in Plutarch's biography of Crassus also mentions that, during the feasting and revelry in the wedding ceremony of Artavazdes' sister to the Parthian king Orodes II's son and heir Pacorus in the Armenian capital of Artashat, Crassus' head was brought to Orodes II. Both kings were enjoying a performance of Euripides' Greek tragedy The Bacchae when a certain actor of the royal court, named Jason of Tralles, took the head and sang the following verses (also from the Bacchae):

 Crassus' head was thus used in place of a prop head representing Pentheus and carried by the character of Agave.

Also according to Plutarch, a final mockery was made ridiculing the memory of Crassus, by dressing up a Roman prisoner, Caius Paccianus, who resembled him in appearance, in women's clothing, calling him "Crassus" and "imperator," and leading him in a spectacular show of a final, mock "triumphal procession," putting to ridiculous use the traditional symbols of Roman triumph and authority.

Chronology
 115 BC  – Crassus is born in Rome, second of three sons of Publius Licinius Crassus (cos. 97 BC, cens. 89 BC);
  97 BC  – Father is consul of Rome;
  87 BC  – Crassus flees to Hispania from Marian forces;
  84 BC  – Joins Sulla against Marius;
  82 BC  – Commands the victorious right wing of Sulla's army at the Colline Gate, the decisive battle of the civil war, fought on Kalends of November;
  78 BC  – Sulla dies in the spring;
  73 BC  – Revolt of Spartacus, probable year Crassus was praetor (it's possible for him to have done so between 75 and 73 BC);
  72 BC  – Crassus is given special command of the war against Spartacus following the ignominious defeats of both consuls;
  71 BC  – Crassus destroys the remaining slave armies in the spring, and is elected consul in the summer;
  70 BC  – Consulship of Crassus and Pompey;
  65 BC  – Crassus is censor with Quintus Lutatius Catulus;
  63 BC  – Catiline conspiracy;
  59 BC  – First Triumvirate formed, with Caesar as consul;
  56 BC  – Conference at Lucca;
  55 BC  – Second consulship of Crassus and Pompey, with Crassus leaving for Syria in November;
  54 BC  – Campaign against the Parthians;
  53 BC  – Crassus dies in the Battle of Carrhae.

Artistic representations

Literature
 Crassus is a major character in Howard Fast's 1951 novel Spartacus.
 Crassus is a major character in the 1956 Alfred Duggan novel Winter Quarters. The novel follows two fictional Gallic nobles who join Julius Caesar's cavalry and then find their way into the service of Marcus' son, Publius Licinius Crassus, in Gaul. The characters eventually become clients of Publius Crassus, and, by extension, his father Marcus. The second half of the novel is related by its Gallic narrator from within the ranks of Crassus' doomed army en route to do battle with Parthia. The book depicts an overconfident and militarily incompetent Crassus up to the moment of his death.
 Crassus is a major character in the 1992 novel Arms of Nemesis by Steven Saylor.  He is portrayed as the cousin and patron of Lucius Licinius, the investigation of whose murder forms the basis of the novel. He also has minor appearances in Roman Blood and Catalina's Riddle.
 In David Drake's Ranks of Bronze (1986), the Lost Legion is the major participant, although Crassus himself has been killed before the book begins.
 Crassus is a major character in Conn Iggulden's Emperor series.
 The story of the battle of Carrhae is the centerpiece of Ben Kane's novel The Forgotten Legion (2008). Crassus is depicted as a vain man with poor military judgment.
 Crassus is a major character in Robert Harris' novel Lustrum (published as Conspirata in the USA), the sequel to Imperium, which both chronicle the career of Marcus Tullius Cicero.
 Crassus is a major character in the novels Fortune's Favourites and Caesar's Women by Colleen McCullough.  He is portrayed as a brave but mediocre general, a brilliant financier, and a true friend of Caesar.

Ballet
 Crassus (Russian: Красс) has a principal role in Aram Khachaturian's 1956 ballet Spartacus.

Drama
Film
 Crassus is a principal character in the 1960 film Spartacus, played by actor Laurence Olivier. The film is based on Howard Fast's 1951 novel of the same name.
 Crassus is the antagonist in the 1962 film The Slave, played by actor Claudio Gora.
 A highly fictionalized version of Crassus called Marcus Crassius is an enemy figure in the film Amazons and Gladiators (2001), played by Patrick Bergin. They mention his defeating Spartacus and that Caesar exiles him due to his popularity to a poor province, where he's very cruel to the populace; he conquers the Amazons, under Queen Zenobia (who apparently rules a tribe of Amazons in the same province, Pannae). In this film, he is killed by a young girl whose family he killed.

Television
 Crassus is a principal character in the 2004 TV film Spartacus, played by actor Angus Macfadyen.
 Crassus appears in a 3rd season episode of Xena: Warrior Princess, where he is beheaded in the Colosseum.
 He is portrayed by Simon Merrells in Spartacus: War of the Damned as the main antagonist. Unlike in Alfred Duggan's novel, he is portrayed as a brilliant military tactician.
 Crassus was also mentioned in the fifth series of Horrible Histories, with a song dedicated to his life parodying Dizzie Rascal's Bonkers sung by Simon Farnaby.
 Crassus appears in the second season of the Netflix original series Roman Empire.

Music
 Crassus, along with Palene, is one of the two narrators in Jeff Wayne's Musical Version of Spartacus. He is played by Anthony Hopkins.

Video games
 Crassus appears as one of the villains in Spartan: Total Warrior.
 Crassus makes an appearance as a Great Merchant in Sid Meier's Civilization V and Sid Meier's Civilization VI.
 Crassus appears as one of the hero centurions in some of the campaign missions in Praetorians. He would later be killed in the campaign mission depicting the battle of Carrhae.
Crassus is referenced in Deep Rock Galactic, as an enemy called the Glyphid Crassus Detonator. Upon death, this enemy produces a large explosion, coating all nearby surfaces with gold that players can harvest.
Crassus appears as a patron for the player to receive objectives from in Grand Ages: Rome, including stopping Spartacus' slave revolt.

See also
 List of wealthiest historical figures

Notes

References

Primary sources
 
 
 
 Dio Cassius Book 40, Stanza 26

Modern works
 Bivar, A.D.H. (1983). "The Political History of Iran Under the Arsacids," in The Cambridge History of Iran (Vol 3:1), 21–99. Edited by Ehsan Yarshater. London, New York, New Rochelle, Melbourne, and Sydney: Cambridge University Press. .
 
 Ward, Allen Mason: Marcus Crassus and the Late Roman Republic (University of Missouri Press, 1977)
 Twyman, Briggs L:  critical review of Marshall 1976 and Ward 1977, Classical Philology 74 (1979), 356–61
 
 
 Sampson, Gareth C: The defeat of Rome: Crassus, Carrhae & the invasion of the east (Pen & Sword Books, 2008) .
 
  Marcus Licinius Crassus
 Lang, David Marshall: Armenia: cradle of civilization (Allen & Unwin, 1970)

Further reading

External links

 Crassus entry in historical sourcebook by Mahlon H. Smith

110s BC births
53 BC deaths
1st-century BC Roman governors of Syria
1st-century BC Roman consuls
First Triumvirate
Marcus
People associated with Julius Caesar
People of the Roman–Parthian Wars
Roman censors
Roman generals killed in action
Roman Republican praetors
Supporters of Sulla
Year of birth uncertain